MacNamara Glacier is a glacier in the Patuxent Range of the Pensacola Mountains in Antarctica, draining northeastward between the Thomas Hills and Anderson Hills to Foundation Ice Stream. It was mapped by the United States Geological Survey from surveys and U.S. Navy air photos, 1956–66, and was named by the Advisory Committee on Antarctic Names for Edlen E. MacNamara, a United States Antarctic Research Program exchange scientist at Molodezhnaya Station, winter 1967.

See also
 List of glaciers in the Antarctic
 Glaciology

References

 

Glaciers of Queen Elizabeth Land